US Post Office-Corning is a historic post office building located at Corning in Steuben County, New York.  It was built in 1908-1909 and is one of a number of post offices in New York State designed by the Office of the Supervising Architect of the Treasury Department, James Knox Taylor. It is a rectangular, one story building faced with pressed yellow brick in the Classical Revival style.  The exterior features elaborate terra cotta decoration.

It was listed on the National Register of Historic Places in 1988.

References

Corning
Neoclassical architecture in New York (state)
Government buildings completed in 1909
Buildings and structures in Steuben County, New York
Corning, New York
National Register of Historic Places in Steuben County, New York